Pentoga is an unincorporated community in Iron County, in the U.S. state of Michigan.

History
A post office was established at Pentoga in 1900, and remained in operation until it was discontinued in 1937. The community was given its name by the owners of  the Montambo mill. The name Pentoga is the nick name of a Chippewa chiefs wife from the area, it means bull head.

References

Unincorporated communities in Iron County, Michigan